The Carmen Sylva forest path is a trail in Opatija, Croatia.

The forest path, which starts  approx. 45°20'00.3"N 14°17'50.0"E and ends approx. 45°20'58.7"N 14°18'35.5"E, was originally called "King Carol's Forest Trail" (König-Carol-Waldweg). 
King Carol I of Romania came to Opatija in April 1896 and stayed in the Villa Angiolina  together with his wife Elisabeth (née Elisabeth of Wied), also known by her literary name of Carmen Sylva. King Carol I is said to have discovered the trail during a horse ride in the woods beneath Veprinac. A plaque today commemorates Baron Arthur Schmidt-Zabierow, the former district principal of Volosko, who constructed the path with funds donated by King Carol.

References

External links 

 Tourist Board Opatija, Forest path of Carmen Sylva  
 Tourist Board Opatija, The forest trails on the Opatija Riviera 
 Opatija: šetalište Carmen Sylva (Croatian)

Hiking trails in Croatia
Primorje-Gorski Kotar County
Tourist attractions in Primorje-Gorski Kotar County
Pedestrian infrastructure in Croatia